Josef Erich Zawinul (7 July 1932 – 11 September 2007) was an Austrian jazz and jazz fusion keyboardist and composer. First coming to prominence with saxophonist Cannonball Adderley, Zawinul went on to play with Miles Davis and to become one of the creators of jazz fusion, a musical genre that combined jazz with rock. He co-founded the groups Weather Report and The Zawinul Syndicate. He pioneered the use of electric piano and synthesizer, and was named "Best Electric Keyboardist" twenty-eight times by the readers of DownBeat magazine.

Biography

Early life and career
Zawinul grew up in Vienna, Austria. Accordion was his first instrument. When he was six or seven, he studied clarinet, violin, and piano at the Vienna Conservatory (Konservatorium Wien). During the 1950s he was a staff pianist for Polydor. He worked as a jazz musician with Hans Koller, Friedrich Gulda, Karl Drewo, and Fatty George. In 1959 he moved to the U.S. to attend Berklee College of Music, but a week later he received a job offer from Maynard Ferguson, so he left school and went on tour. He then accompanied Dinah Washington. He spent most of the 1960s with Cannonball Adderley. During this time he wrote "Mercy, Mercy, Mercy" and "Walk Tall", and "Country Preacher" and played electric piano. At the end of the decade he recorded with Miles Davis on In a Silent Way as Davis was establishing the genre of jazz fusion, combining jazz with rock.

With Weather Report

In 1970, Zawinul founded Weather Report with Wayne Shorter. Their first two years emphasized a relatively open, group improvisation format similar to what Miles Davis was doing in a more rock oriented format. However, Zawinul started making changes with their third album, Sweetnighter. Funk elements such as bass guitar and wah-wah pedal began to be introduced to the band's sound. With the fourth album, Mysterious Traveller, the musical forms were composed similar to classical music, and the combination of jazz harmonies with 1970s groove helped move the band into its most commercially successful period.

The band's biggest commercial success came from Zawinul's composition "Birdland" on the 1977 album Heavy Weather, which peaked at number 30 on the Billboard pop albums chart. "Birdland" is one of the most recognizable jazz pieces of the 1970s, recorded by The Manhattan Transfer, Quincy Jones, Maynard Ferguson, and Buddy Rich among others. The song won him three Grammys.

Weather Report was active until the mid-1980s, with Zawinul and Shorter remaining the sole constant members through multiple personnel shifts. Shorter and Zawinul went separate ways after recording Sportin' Life, but it was discovered they had to do one more album to fulfill their contract with CBS Records. This Is This! therefore became the band's final album.

In 1991, Zawinul was awarded an Honorary Doctorate of Music from Berklee College of Music and on this occasion performed with a group consisting of Matthew Garrison, Torsten de Winkel, Abe Laboriel Jr. and Melvin Butler.

With The Zawinul Syndicate 

The Zawinul Syndicate was a jazz fusion band formed in 1988. It evolved out of Weather Report.
Their style could be described as a combination of unusual grooves, driving and swinging rhythms and many borrowings from different music cultures.

Zawinul himself stated that he gave the band its name due to a syndicate bearing more resemblance to a family than "just" a band.

After the death of Zawinul in 2007, several members of The Zawinul Syndicate decided to reform and performing Zawinul's music live under their shortened name The Syndicate.

Several major members of the Syndicate over the years include Scott Henderson, Bobby Thomas Jr, Linley Marthe, Paco Sery, Manolo Badrena, Nathaniel Townsley, Sabine Kabongo, Gary Poulson, Richard Bona, and Victor Bailey.

Stories of the Danube 

Zawinul also wrote a symphony, called Stories of the Danube, which was commissioned by the Brucknerhaus, Linz. It was first performed as part of the Linzer Klangwolke (a large-scale open-air broadcast event), for the opening of the 1993 Bruckner Festival in Linz. In its seven movements, the symphony traces the course of the Danube from Donaueschingen through various countries ending at the Black Sea. It was recorded in 1995 by the Czech State Philharmonic Orchestra, Brno, conducted by Caspar Richter.

Death 
Zawinul became ill and was hospitalized in his native Vienna on 7 August 2007, after concluding a five-week European tour. He died a little over a month later from a rare form of skin cancer (Merkel cell carcinoma) on 11 September 2007. He was cremated at Feuerhalle Simmering and his ashes buried in Vienna Central Cemetery.

Discography

As leader/co-leader 

 To You With Love  (Strand, 1959) 
 Soulmates with Ben Webster (Riverside, 1963)
 Money in the Pocket (Atlantic, 1966)
 The Rise and Fall of the Third Stream (Vortex, 1968)
 Zawinul (Atlantic, 1971) – recorded in 1970
 Concerto Retitled (Atlantic, 1976) – compilation
 Di•a•lects (Columbia, 1986) – recorded in 1985
 The Zawinul Syndicate, The Immigrants (Columbia, 1988)
 Music for Two Pianos with Friedrich Gulda (Capriccio, 1988)
 The Zawinul Syndicate, Black Water (Columbia, 1989)
 The Zawinul Syndicate, Lost Tribes (Columbia, 1992)
 My People (ESC, 1996) – recorded between 1992–96
 Stories of the Danube (Polygram, 1996)
 The Zawinul Syndicate, World Tour (ESC, 1998)[2CD] – live
 Mauthausen - Vom großen Sterben hören (ESC, 2000)
 Faces & Places (ESC, 2002) – recorded between  2001–02
 Midnight Jam (ESC, 2004)[2CD]
 The Zawinul Syndicate, Vienna Nights: Live at Joe Zawinul's Birdland (BHM, 2005)[2CD] – live
 Brown Street with WDR Big Band, et al. (Intuition, 2006)[2CD] – live recorded in 2005
Posthumous releases
 The Zawinul Syndicate, 75 (Heads Up, 2009)[2CD] – live recorded in 2007
 The Absolute Ensemble, Absolute Zawinul conducted by Kristjan Järvi (Intuition, 2009) – recorded in 2007. overdubs recorded between 2007–08.

As leader of Weather Report
 1971: Weather Report (Columbia, 1971)
 1972: I Sing the Body Electric (Columbia, 1972)
 1972: Live in Tokyo (CBS/Sony, 1972) – live
 1973: Sweetnighter (Columbia, 1973)
 1974: Mysterious Traveller (Columbia, 1974)
 1975: Tale Spinnin' (Columbia, 1975)
 1975–76: Black Market (Columbia, 1976)
 1976–77: Heavy Weather (Columbia, 1977)
 1978: Mr. Gone (Columbia, 1978)
 1978–79: 8:30 (Columbia, 1979) – live
 1980: Night Passage (Columbia, 1980)
 1981: Weather Report (Columbia, 1982)
 1983: Procession (Columbia, 1983)
 1983: Domino Theory (Columbia, 1984)
 1984: Sportin' Life (Columbia, 1985)
 1985: This Is This! (Columbia, 1986)

Posthumous compilations
 Live and Unreleased (Columbia, 2002)[2CD]
 Forecast: Tomorrow (Columbia, 2006)[3CD & DVD-Video]
 The Legendary Live Tapes: 1978-1981 (Columbia, 2015)[4CD]

As sideman 

With Cannonball Adderley
 Nancy Wilson/Cannonball Adderley (Capitol, 1962) - recorded in 1961
 The Cannonball Adderley Sextet in New York (Riverside, 1962)
 Cannonball in Europe! (Riverside, 1962)
 Jazz Workshop Revisited (Riverside, 1962)
 Nippon Soul (Riverside, 1964) - recorded in 1963
 Cannonball Adderley Live! (Capitol, 1964) - live
 Live Session! (Capitol, 1964) - live
 Cannonball Adderley's Fiddler on the Roof (Capitol, 1964)
 Domination (Capitol, 1965)
 Great Love Themes (Capitol, 1966)
 Cannonball in Japan (Capitol, 1966) - live
 Mercy, Mercy, Mercy! Live at 'The Club' (Capitol, 1967) - recorded in 1966
 74 Miles Away (Capitol, 1967)
 Why Am I Treated So Bad! (Capitol, 1967)
 In Person (Capitol, 1968)
 Accent on Africa (Capitol, 1968)
 Country Preacher (Capitol, 1970) - live recorded in 1969
 The Cannonball Adderley Quintet & Orchestra (Capitol, 1970)
 The Price You Got to Pay to Be Free (Capitol, 1970)
 Autumn Leaves (Riverside [Japan], 1975) - recorded in 1963
 The Sextet (Milestone, 1982) - recorded in 1962-63
 Radio Nights (Night, 1991) - recorded in 1967–68
 Money in the Pocket (Capitol, 2005) - recorded in 1966

With Nat Adderley
 Naturally! (Jazzland, 1961)
 Autobiography (Atlantic, 1965)
 Live at Memory Lane (Atlantic, 1967) - live recorded in 1966
 The Scavenger (Milestone, 1968)
 Calling Out Loud (CTI, 1968)
 You, Baby (CTI, 1969) - recorded in 1968

With Miles Davis
 1969: In a Silent Way (Columbia, 1969)
 1969: Bitches Brew (Columbia, 1970)
 1970: Live-Evil (Columbia, 1971)
 compilation: Big Fun (Columbia, 1974)
 compilation: Circle in the Round (Columbia, 1979)

With Yusef Lateef
 The Centaur and the Phoenix (Riverside, 1960)
 Suite 16 (Atlantic, 1970)

With Herbie Mann
 A Mann & A Woman (Atlantic, 1967) – also with Tamiko Jones. recorded in 1966.
 The Beat Goes On (Atlantic, 1967) – recorded in 1964-67

With Dinah Washington
 What a Diff'rence a Day Makes! (Mercury, 1959)
 The Two of Us (Mercury, 1960) – also with Brook Benton
 Live at Birdland (Baldwin, 1997) – live recorded in 1962

With others
 Trilok Gurtu, Crazy Saints (Creative Music Production, 1993)
 Victor Feldman, Soviet Jazz Themes (Äva, 1963) - recorded in 1962
 Jimmy Forrest, Out of the Forrest (Prestige, 1961)
 Eddie Harris, Silver Cycles (Atlantic, 1969) – recorded in 1968
 Sam Jones, Down Home (Riverside, 1962)
 Quincy Jones, Back on the Block (Quest/Warner Bros, 1989) – recorded in 1988–89
 Katia Labèque, Little Girl Blue (Dreyfus, 1995)
 David "Fathead" Newman, The Many Facets of David Newman (Atlantic, 1969) – recorded in 1968–69

References

Biographies

Further reading

External links 

 Joe Zawinul's official website
 In-depth interview with Anil Prasad of Innerviews

Austrian jazz keyboardists
Austrian jazz composers
Male jazz composers
Hard bop pianists
Jazz-funk keyboardists
Jazz fusion keyboardists
Soul-jazz keyboardists
Weather Report members
Berklee College of Music alumni
People from Landstraße
Deaths from Merkel-cell carcinoma
Deaths from cancer in Austria
Burials at the Vienna Central Cemetery
Miles Davis
1932 births
2007 deaths
Male pianists
Cannonball Adderley Quintet members
The Zawinul Syndicate members
Austrian Sinti people
20th-century jazz composers
20th-century male musicians